KJJK (1020 AM) is a radio station licensed to Fergus Falls, Minnesota. The station serves the Fergus Falls-Detroit Lakes area. The station is currently owned by Leighton Broadcasting, through licensee Leighton Radio Holdings, Inc.

The studios and offices are west of downtown Fergus Falls, at 728 Western Avenue North, near I94. It shares a transmitter site with KJJK-FM, southeast of Fergus Falls, near Wall Lake.

History
The Federal Communications Commission issued a construction permit for the station on September 8, 1986. The station was assigned the KJJK call sign on September 23, 1986, and received its license to cover on February 12, 1987. The station formerly broadcast an oldies format as "Groovy 1020" and a sports talk format as "1020 The Game".

On December 28, 2016, after running Christmas music through most of the month and stunting for 48 hours with non-stop music by Minneapolis native Prince, KJJK flipped to Top 40/CHR as "Channel 97.7", utilizing newly signed-on translator K249EZ to expand its signal to FM. An afternoon host using the name "McLovin" will debut in early January.

Former logo

References

External links

Radio stations in Minnesota
Contemporary hit radio stations in the United States
Radio stations established in 1987
Fergus Falls, Minnesota